The Dessert: Harmony in Red is a painting by French artist Henri Matisse, from 1908.  It is considered by some critics to be Matisse's masterpiece.  This Fauvist painting follows the example set by Impressionism with the overall lack of a central focal point.

The painting was commissioned  as "Harmony in Blue," but Matisse was dissatisfied with the result, and so he painted it over with his preferred red.

It is in the permanent collection of the Hermitage Museum.

References

External links
 All About Henri Matisse- Gallery Henry
 MyStudios- Matisse, The Dessert: A Harmony in Red

1908 paintings
Paintings by Henri Matisse
Paintings in the collection of the Hermitage Museum
Still life paintings